Craig Marcus Watkins (born November 16, 1967) is an American lawyer. He was the  district attorney for the Dallas County, Texas in the United States from 2007 to 2015.  He became the first elected African American district attorney in Texas after he was elected in 2006.

Education
A 1986 graduate of David W. Carter High School of Dallas, Watkins graduated from Prairie View A&M University in 1990 with a B.A. degree in political science. In 1994, he received a J.D. degree as part of the 1994 inaugural graduating class of the Texas Wesleyan University School of Law.  He is also a member of the Kappa Alpha Psi fraternity.

Career
Three times the Dallas County District Attorney's office rejected Watkins's bids to be a prosecutor. Watkins thus began his legal career working in the offices of the Dallas city attorney and public defender and later went into private practice. In 2002, Watkins ran for district attorney against incumbent Republican Bill Hill and lost. Watkins won the 2006 district attorney election over prosecutor Toby Shook in an election cycle where Democrats swept all judge seats also.

The official biography of Watkins written by his office writes that Watkins has secured a 99.4% conviction rate and has focused on prosecuting cases of child sexual abuse.  Watkins created the first Conviction Integrity Unit in the nation resulting in 35 wrongfully convicted individuals being freed under his administration. Watkins has worked to resolve cases of wrongful conviction through the use of DNA testing and the review of evidence illegally withheld from defense attorneys.  On January 4, 2011, Ray Suarez interviewed Watkins live on the PBS NewsHour for the exoneration by Watkins's office of Cornelius Dupree from Dupree's armed robbery conviction.  Upon leaving office Watkins entered private practice focusing on complex Federal and State Criminal Defense and Personal Injury.

The Dallas Morning News selected Watkins as its 2008 Texan of the Year.

Watkins is a member of The National Trial Lawyers Association, The Texas Trial Lawyers Association and The Dallas Criminal Defense Lawyers Association.

Public records indicate that Watkins' yearly salary as of May 2012 was $200,000.

In the 2014 election, Watkins was defeated by former Judge Susan Hawk.

See also
Dallas County District Attorney
Dallas DNA
craigwatkinslaw.com
Craig Watkins The History Maker

References

External links
Dallas County District Attorney website
Watkins interview on PBS NewsHour about the exoneration of Cornelius Dupree
Watkins interview on ""60 Minutes
https://www.texasmonthly.com/news-politics/craigs-list/
https://www.wsj.com/articles/SB122669736692929339

D Magazine

Watkins interview on the View

Dallas DNA on Investigative Discovery

1967 births
Living people
African-American lawyers
County district attorneys in Texas
Texas Democrats
People from Dallas
Prairie View A&M University alumni
Texas Wesleyan University alumni
Texas A&M University School of Law alumni
21st-century African-American people
20th-century African-American people